Prosotherium is an extinct genus of hegetotheriid notoungulate. It lived during the Late Oligocene (between ~29-24 Ma), and its fossilized remains were found in South America.

Description

This animal was similar to rabbits, in aspect and in size. Its hind legs were particularly long.

Crania

Its crania was light and thin, notably in the posterior part. The tympanic part of the temporal bone was particularly developed, even more than its relative Pachyrukhos, and it is probable that its auricle was quite large, similar to the ears of a hare. The maxilla and the mandible were high and deep ; the mandible had a subtle coronoid process. The teeth were characterized by incisors pointing inward, molars and premolars covered by a thin layer of dental cementum, generally on the outside part of the upper teeth and on the inside part of the lower teeth.

Postcranial skeleton
The humerus was large and thin, like the ulna and radius. Metacarpals and phalanges indicates that the hand was small and delicate. The pelvis was elongated, slender and lightly build, while the femur was equipped of a small head separated from the main bone. The femur was even longer than in Pachyrukhos, and had a small trochanter curiously pushed back in the posterior part. Contrary to Pachyrukhos, the tibia and fibula were completely separated. The talus bone was likewise characteristic, with the trochlear nerve extant covering entirely the dorsal part of the bone, and a low and flat condylar crest. The calcaneus was relatively small, with an articulated facet for the cuboid bone slightly concave and occupying the entire distal part of the bone. The metatarsal was robust and shorter than in Pachyrukhos. The distal phalanx was high and narrow, flattening and widening towards the terminal part.

Classification

The genus Prosotherium was first described in 1897 by Florentino Ameghino, over fossilized remains discovered in Patagonia in Late Oligocene terrains. The type species is Prosotherium garzoni, and Ameghino described in this same paper P. triangulidens, which was a bit larger than the type species, as well as P. robustum. P. quartum, a fourth species, was described in 1901 by Ameghino. Only the first name is still considered valid.

Prosotherium was a member of the Hegetotheriidae, a clade of light, rodent-like or hare-like Notoungulata. Prosotherium was a member of the Pachyrukhinae subfamily comprising several hare-like genera. It is possible that Prosotherium was an ancestral form or a close relative of Paedotherium, more specialized.

Paleobiology

The Late Oligocene terrains of Patagonia present at least three genera of hegetotheres with hypsodont teeth : Prosotherium, Propachyrucos and Medistylus, the latter of which is sometimes considered an interatheriid. This implies a strict repartition of ecological niches among the Oligocene hegetotheres, but also reflects the remarkable evolutionary radiation of rodent-like ungulates during the Cenozoic of South America, and suggest environmental differences between the fauna of Patagonia and the fauna of Uruguay and Bolivia, where those animals were absent.

References

Typotheres
Oligocene mammals of South America
Deseadan
Paleogene Argentina
Fossils of Argentina
Fossil taxa described in 1895
Taxa named by Florentino Ameghino
Prehistoric placental genera
Golfo San Jorge Basin
Sarmiento Formation